Dysorthography is a disorder of spelling which accompanies dyslexia by a direct consequence of the phonological disorder.
In the American classification from the American Psychiatric Association (APA) and the classification from the World Health Organization (WHO), it is a subtype of specific learning disorder with impairment in written expression.

To be noted that dysgraphia is not a symptom related to spelling difficulties but motor difficulties

See also
 Neurolinguistics
 Orthography
 Dyslexia

References

Neurodevelopmental disorders
Writing
Learning disabilities